Semimytilus algosus is a species of mussels. A common name for this species is Bisexual mussel, or Dwarf mussel. It is the first species where trioecy was reported in the phylum Mollusca.

Size 
Individuals can be up to 42 mm or 50 mm in size.

Reproduction 
The species reproduces sexually. In the past this species was described as simultaneous hermaphroditic but it was later confirmed the species is trioecious.  It is believed this species evolved from a gonochoric ancestor.

Occurrence 
Its habitat is rocky shores. The species has been found off the coasts of South Africa and is native to Chile. The species is also invasive off the coast of Angola and Namibia.

References 

Mytilidae